The Stonehenge Limestone is a geologic formation in Maryland. It preserves fossils dating back to the Ordovician period.

See also
 List of fossiliferous stratigraphic units in Maryland
 Paleontology in Maryland

References

 

Ordovician Maryland